Group A of the 1995 Fed Cup Americas Zone Group II was one of two pools in the Americas Zone Group I of the 1995 Fed Cup. Four teams competed in a round robin competition, with the top two teams advancing to the knockout stage and the bottom team being relegated down to Group II for 1996.

Uruguay vs. Guatemala

Uruguay vs. El Salvador

El Salvador vs. Guatemala

See also
Fed Cup structure

References

External links
 Fed Cup website

1995 Fed Cup Americas Zone